Jonathan Moore (born November 3, 1957) is an American former basketball player who is best known for his collegiate career at Furman University between 1976 and 1980. A native of Charleston, South Carolina, Moore finished his career as one of the greatest players in Southern Conference history.

During his four-year tenure at Furman, Moore averaged 16.9 points per game, became one of only three players in conference history to be named First Team All-SoCon four times, was a two-time SoCon Basketball tournament MVP and was twice named the Southern Conference Men's Basketball Player of the Year. He scored 2,299 points and grabbed 1,242 rebounds, placing him on an exclusive list of NCAA Division I men's basketball players to achieve both of those milestones. Through the 2009–10 season, his rebounds total is sixth all-time in conference history, while his points total ranks eighth.

After his collegiate career ended, Moore was selected in the third round (64th overall) in the 1980 NBA Draft by the Detroit Pistons. However, he never played a game in the league. Moore spent the first season out of college in Italy playing for Nuova Pallacanestro Vigevano with another Furman alumnus, Clyde Mayes. He was hoping to become more NBA-ready by playing a year of professional basketball abroad and then try to make the Pistons' roster for the  season, but ultimately it never worked out.  Moore played 14 seasons in Finland's Korisliiga from 1983 to 1998, and holds also a Finnish citizenship.

See also
List of NCAA Division I men's basketball players with 2000 points and 1000 rebounds

References

External links
Finnish League profile

1957 births
Living people
American expatriate basketball people in Finland
American expatriate basketball people in Italy
American men's basketball players
Basketball players from South Carolina
Detroit Pistons draft picks
Finnish people of African-American descent
Finnish people of American descent
Furman Paladins men's basketball players
Power forwards (basketball)
Sportspeople from Charleston, South Carolina
Naturalized citizens of Finland